Gary Jones is a United States businessman and Republican politician from Oklahoma.  He is the former Oklahoma State Auditor and Inspector.

Personal
Jones was born in Fort Sill, Oklahoma, the fifth of seven children.  He graduated from Cameron University in 1978 with a Bachelor of Business Administration/Accounting degree.  Jones is both a certified public accountant and a certified fraud examiner.

While in college, Jones worked for Southwestern Bell.  After 10 years Jones left to start his own telecommunications company, which he sold 16 years later.  Jones has operated a cow-calf operation for over 30 years in addition to his other ventures.

In 1994 Jones successfully ran for Comanche County Commissioner, a seat he held for four years.

Prior to his successful 2010 bid for State Auditor and Inspector, Jones unsuccessfully sought the office in both 2002 and 2006, losing both times to Jeff McMahan.

In 2003 he was named chairman and Executive Director of the Oklahoma Republican Party and held the office longer than anyone prior, until resigning to make his successful bid for State Auditor and Inspector.

In 2017, Gary Jones announced he would be a Republican candidate for Governor of Oklahoma in 2018. Gary Jones placed 5th in a 10-man primary that was held on June 26, 2018. He received almost 6% of the vote.

Electoral history

References

|-

|-

1955 births
21st-century American politicians
Cameron University alumni
Candidates in the 2018 United States elections
Living people
Oklahoma Republicans
People from Fort Sill, Oklahoma
State Auditors of Oklahoma